Nikita Nikiforov (born 1983) is a Latvian Russian politician. He is a member of Harmony and a deputy of the 12th Saeima.

External links
Saeima website

General references
</ref>

1983 births
Living people
Latvian people of Russian descent
Social Democratic Party "Harmony" politicians
Deputies of the 10th Saeima
Deputies of the 11th Saeima
Deputies of the 12th Saeima